The 1997 D.C. United season was the clubs' third year of existence, as well as their second season in Major League Soccer. The United successfully defended their MLS Cup title, becoming the first and only club to consecutively win the MLS Cup, until Houston Dynamo in 2007. Additionally, United won their first ever MLS Supporters' Shield in 1997, earning their first league "double" by winning the regular season and the playoffs.

Background 

The 1996 Major League Soccer season was both Major League Soccer and D.C. United's debut season, which resulted in United winning the inaugural MLS Cup championship match.

Review

Competitions

Preseason

Major League Soccer

Conference standings

Overall standings

Results summary

Results by round

Game reports

MLS Cup Playoffs

Bracket 

The ties were a best of three series.

Conference semifinals 

D.C. United win the series 2–0.

Conference finals 

D.C. United win the series 2–0.

MLS Cup

U.S. Open Cup

CONCACAF Champions' Cup

Bracket

Match results

Statistics

Transfers

See also 
 1997 in American soccer
 1997 Major League Soccer season
 List of D.C. United seasons

1997
Dc United
Dc United
1997 in sports in Washington, D.C.
MLS Cup champion seasons
Supporters' Shield winning seasons